Paolo Buonfiglio (Prato, 28 January 1995) is an Italian rugby union player.
His usual position is as a Prop and he currently plays for Zebre in Pro14.

Under contract with Mogliano, in 2015–16 Pro12 season, he named as Additional Player for Benetton Treviso in Pro 12.

In 2014 and 2015, Buonfiglio was named in the Italy Under 20 squad and in 2016 and 2017 he was named in the Emerging Italy squad.  On 8 November 2021 he was named in the Italy A squad for the 2021 end-of-year rugby union internationals.

References

External links 

Player Profile

1995 births
Living people
Italian rugby union players
Rugby union props
Mogliano Rugby players
Zebre Parma players
People from Prato